Nanyang Polytechnic (NYP) is a post-secondary education institution and statutory board under the purview of the Ministry of Education in Singapore. 

Established in 1992, NYP is renowned for its digital media, infocomm, and nursing programmes.

History
Nanyang Polytechnic (NYP) was established on 1 April 1992 and enrolled its first batch of students for its School of Health Sciences and School of Business Management in July 1992. The School of Engineering and the School of Information Technology were opened in July 1993.

The French-Singapore Institute, German-Singapore Institute and the Japan-Singapore Institute were transferred from the Economic Development Board to the Polytechnic in February 1993.

NYP originally operated from five temporary campuses (Bukit Merah and Tiong Bahru: School of Business; Jurong: School of Engineering; Outram: School of Nursing; Yishun: School of Engineering and School of Information Technology) before moving to its permanent home in Ang Mo Kio in April 1998.

In April 2021, the School of Chemical and Life Sciences (SCL) was rebranded to the School of Applied Science. That same year, the School of Design and the School of Interactive & Digital Media merged to form the School of Design & Media.

Mr Chan Lee Mun took over as Principal and CEO in August 2007; Mr Lin Cheng Ton went on to head NYP International.

Ms Jeanne Liew took over as Principal and CEO in July 2015.

Facilities
The convenience of travelling makes it a popular choice among students. The polytechnic houses blocks for administration, recreational, student development purposes and staff accommodation. Facilities include a fully computerised library, laboratories, a theatre for the Arts and an auditorium. Retail outlets on campus provide a variety of food and beverage as well as other leisure items.

Sports facilities include an adventure challenge park, track and field, gym, tennis courts and rock-climbing walls. There's also an indoor air-conditioned sports hall for badminton, table tennis and basketball. An Olympic-sized swimming pool is located beside the sports hall.

Organisation
Nanyang Polytechnic has six academic schools, offering a variety of courses.

 School of Applied Science (SAS)
 School of Business Management (SBM)
 School of Design & Media (SDM)
 School of Engineering (SEG)
 School of Health & Social Sciences (SHSS)
 School of Information Technology (SIT)

School of Applied Science
The Nanyang Polytechnic School of Applied Science (NYP SAS) organises field trips to pharmaceutical plants and research institutes to provide learning experiences for students. 

The school provides industrial attachment programmes in which students can gain first-hand learning experience of the life science industry before they graduate. Opportunities for attachment to companies overseas are also available under the Overseas Industrial Placement Programme.

School of Business Management
The Nanyang Polytechnic School of Business Management (NYP SBM) simulates a modern "Teaching Enterprise" environment that is in tune with the latest developments in the real business world.

Students have opportunities to work in an actual business environment and study key business modules in the first two years, before specialising in the second and final year of study.

School of Design & Media
The Nanyang Polytechnic School of Design & Media (NYP SDM) provides training in architecture, product design, digital media, animation and game development.

School of Engineering
The Nanyang Polytechnic School of Engineering (NYP SEG) has a practice-oriented learning environment focusing on creating, designing, implementing and operating engineering systems and solutions.

School of Health & Social Sciences
The Nanyang Polytechnic School of Health & Social Sciences (NYP SHSS) is an established school where learners can gain the knowledge and skills to become healthcare and social service, professionals.

School of Information Technology
The Nanyang Polytechnic School of Information Technology (NYP SIT) is one of the founding schools of Nanyang Polytechnic and started in July 1993. It offers a contextual teaching and learning approach where students can work full-time on projects: taking theoretical concepts and turning them into real-world solutions.

Recognition

Nanyang Polytechnic has won many awards and recognitions. These include:
 Work-Life Achiever Award (2012)
 Singapore Quality Award (2011)
 Public Service Achievement Award (2010)
 Innovation Excellence Award (2009)
 SHRI Leading HR Practices in E-Human Resource Management Award (2009)
 Hewitt Best Employer Award (2009)
 BCA Green Mark Platinum Award (2005)
 ASEAN Energy Efficiency and Conservation Best Practices Competition (2004)
 ISO9001:2000 Certification (2001)
 ISO9001 Certification (2000)
 ISO14001 Certification (1999)
 ISO9002 Certification (1996)

Student achievements
Nanyang Polytechnic has many students who have achieved success at both national and international levels. Some accolades include:

 2013 WorldSkills Leipzig 
 2 golds, 3 medallions for excellence 
 Federation of International Robot-soccer Association RoboWorld Cup 2012
 7 gold, 3 silver and 2 bronze, the world record for 6-metre sprint
 SLA Spatial Challenge 2012
 Champions
 2012 WorldSkills Singapore 
 21 medals
 Tan Kah Kee Young Inventors' Award 2012
 7 awards
 2012 National InfoComm Competition 
 Champions 
 2010 WorldSkills Global 
 2 golds, 1 bronze and 3 medallions for excellence

Notable alumni

Entertainment
 Romeo Tan, Mediacorp actor
 Carrie Wong, Mediacorp actress
 Chantalle Ng, Mediacorp actress
 Hossan Leong, Singaporean actor
 Vanessa Peh, Miss Singapore World 2018
 Anupama Aura Gurung, Miss Nepal Earth 2011

Sports
 Hariss Harun, footballer and captain of the Singapore national team
 Lionel Lewis, former Singapore national team footballer
 Helena Wong, Singaporean weightlifter
 Reuben Kee, Singaporean dragon boat paddler

References

External links

 

Polytechnics in Singapore
Statutory boards of the Singapore Government
Educational institutions established in 1992
Education in Singapore
Schools in Ang Mo Kio
Nursing schools in Singapore
Education in North-East Region, Singapore
1992 establishments in Singapore